Unearth is a 2020 American horror film directed and edited by John C. Lyons and Dorota Swies, from a screenplay by Lyons and Kelsey Goldberg. It stars Adrienne Barbeau and Marc Blucas as the respective heads of two neighboring farm families in the rural United States. When one of the families leases their land to a natural gas company, the resulting fracking releases a force that threatens the lives of both families. Alongside Barbeau and Blucas, the film's cast includes P. J. Marshall, Allison McAtee, Rachel McKeon, Monica Wyche, and Brooke Sorenson.

Unearth premiered at the Fantasia International Film Festival in August 2020. It received a theatrical release on Earth Day, April 22, 2021. The Museum of Modern Art (MoMA) in New York opened its Messaging the Monstrous: Eco Horror program on August 22, 2022 with the film and Q&A with filmmakers, John C. Lyons and Dorota Swies, hosted by curator, Caryn Coleman.

Plot
In rural Pennsylvania, two farming families - the Lomacks (father George, daughters, Heather and Kim and grandson Reece, Kim's infant son), and the Dolans (Kathryn, Tom and daughter Christina) - maintain a long-running feud. Both families have fallen on desperate times financially, exacerbating the situation. George Lomack, a single father operating a failing auto repair business, is approached by representatives of Patriot Exploration, a natural gas fracking company with an interest in acquiring drilling rights on his land. Eager to earn money for his two daughters, George accepts the offer. This is to the horror of Dolan matriarch Kathryn, and the tension between the two families escalates further.

Patriot Exploration brings in their equipment and begins operations on the Lomack property, greatly disrupting the lives of the two families. Strange events begin soon thereafter; the members of both families gradually suffer the effects of a strange illness, initially compelling them to obsessively scratch their skin. As their sanity degenerates from the illness, George's infant grandson senses something wrong with the tap water and refuses to drink it, but the others do. Other strange events occur, such as the conspicuous absence of wildlife sounds outside the families' homes.

The illness is the result of a fungus unearthed by the fracking, poisoning the air and water. Kathryn goes missing after working in the barn and suffering from a coughing fit, she crawls through the woods. Christina and Tom Dolan go looking for her and Tom finds her body attached to a tree after the fungus has sprouted tendrils and attached itself to the tree. While Tom looks at her in horror, a sack on a tendril explodes, covering Tom in a substance. Kim finds Reece (George's grandson) 
in his crib, his body reduced to a gelatinous mass after his skin is digested by the fungus. Kim is shot by Aubrey Dolan (Tom's wife?) under the influence of the fungus. Heather kills Aubrey as she is attacking George. George drives Kim to a neighbors house for help; Heather stays behind. George attacks and presumably kills the neighbor while hallucinating and seeing his own face.

Heather shows up at the Lomack home, while Christina is in the kitchen. Tom shows up and Christina, hallucinating that he has the same tendrils growing from his body and head as Aubrey did, shoots and kills him. Heather and Christina leave and go to the firewatch stand in the woods and pass out. Christina, still hallucinating, thinks Heather has changed and sees blood running down her legs. She makes her way to a car and finds a rifle; firing it in the general direction of the firewatch. After only firing once, the rifle is empty. She then drives into the corn fields before getting the car stuck and passes out. From this point forward, it is hard to tell if the events are really happening or if they are hallucinations as Christina and Heather are in normal clothes with no signs of the fungus infection and carrying on about their day as normal, having taken over the farms as Katheryn mentioned several times.

George and the few survivors return to farming the land. However, the survivors are seen scratching their skin, suggesting they may still be infected. During the end credits, the harvested corn from the Dolan farm travels by truck to an unknown destination in a bayside city. The drone viewpoint also reveals that the watershed from the farms appears to flow in the direction of the bay, leading to the ocean.

Cast
 Adrienne Barbeau as Kathryn Dolan
 Marc Blucas as George Lomack
 Brooke Sorenson as Kim Lomack
 Allison McAtee as Christina Dolan
 Rachel McKeon as Heather Lomack
 P.J. Marshall as Tom Dolan
 Monica Wyche as Aubrey Dolan

Production
Unearth was filmed in northwestern Pennsylvania.

Themes
Co-director Dorota Swies stated that the film is "not just about fracking but how, in general, we take the goods of nature for granted. Greed and ignorance have already destroyed our water supplies with chemicals, biological or radiological waste." Co-director John C. Lyons added:

Adrienne Barbeau said that the larger issues in the film were her attraction to the material.

Release
Unearth premiered at the Fantasia International Film Festival in August 2020. The film's international distribution rights were acquired by Reel Suspects that year. Cinedigm acquired the rights for the film in the U.S. and Canada, and released the film at Laemmle Theatres in North Hollywood, Los Angeles, California, on April 20, 2021. It received a wider theatrical release on Earth Day, April 22, 2021. It also screened at the Sunset Drive-in in Waterford, Pennsylvania on April 29, 2021. The Ultimate Edition Blu-ray was released on April 19, 2022.

Reception

Critical response 

Rachel Reeves of Rue Morgue wrote "Fueled by timely societal and economic anxieties, strong performances and a convincingly genuine understanding of the subject matter, Unearth is a worthy slow-burn look at real-world terrors through a unique horror-tinted lens." Jenn Adams, writer for Consequence, said "Unearth is a timely metaphor in the midst of a pandemic which has crippled the US economy." Jim Hemphill, profiled the film's directors, John C. Lyons and Dorota Swies, for Filmmaker Magazine and praised their efforts stating "together they've crafted one of the best films of 2020 in any genre." In her four out of five star review, Zofia Wijaszka, for FirstShowing.net said "Next to powerful storytelling that relates directly to our modern world of damaging technology and bloody outcomes, there's well-crafted characters that we want to believe in. If you want to see a horror story that talks about the power of nature and showcases human relationships, this film delivers exactly that."

Nick Allen, writing for RogerEbert.com, though praising the film's make-up effects, wrote that it "turns into a gnarly soap opera, and moments of shocking violence are met with an eye-roll instead of the shock that comes from winding up an audience." He added: "it bungles even its thesis statement [...] That the movie can't even make its argument effectively is a death knell, and indicative of how misconceived it is with such a compelling concept." Drew Tinnin of Dread Central gave the film a score of three out of five stars, commending the performances of Barbeau and Blucas as "the two posts in the ground that humanize this story even when the fantastical elements start to sprout", but writing that the film's "directors may have had two different visions that may have conflicted with each other."

Accolades 
Unearth writers, John C. Lyons and Kelsey Goldberg, were awarded Best Screenplay at the Isla Calavera Festival de Cine Fantástico "for transmitting a brilliant mixture between an ecological message in deep America and a desperate economic situation." Unearth was awarded the ReFrame Project's stamp of distinction for being a gender-balanced production.

See also
 List of eco-horror films

References

External links
 
 
 

2020 horror films
American horror films
Environmental films
Films about farmers
Films set on farms
Films set in the United States
2020s English-language films
2020s American films
English-language horror films